The 2008 Maidstone Borough Council election took place on 1 May 2008 to elect members of Maidstone Borough Council in Kent, England. One third of the council was up for election and the Conservative Party gained overall control of the council from no overall control.

After the election, the composition of the council was:
Conservative 29
Liberal Democrat 20
Independent 5
Labour 1

Background
Before the election the Conservatives were the largest party on the council with 27 seats, but did not have a majority. The council however was run by a coalition of the other groups, with the Liberal Democrats leading an alliance with Labour and the independents. Between them these groups had 28 seats, until the resignation of Liberal Democrat councillor Peter Hooper, after he was arrested in relation to a computer-related crime, left them with the same number of seats as the Conservatives.

19 seats were being contested in the election, with the Conservatives defending 8 and the Liberal Democrats 7.

Election result
The results saw the Conservatives gain a majority of the council after making a net gain of 2 seats, in what was the first time any party had a majority on the council for 25 years. The Conservatives went up to 29 seats, while the Liberal Democrats dropped one seat to 20. The Labour group leader Morel D'Souza was defeated in Fant ward and his party was reduced to just 1 seat. Meanwhile, the independents went up by 1 seat to have 5 seats on the council. Overall turnout in the election was 35.58%.

Ward results

References

2008 English local elections
2008
2000s in Kent